Pachybrachius fracticollis is a species of dirt-colored seed bug in the family Rhyparochromidae. It is found in Europe and Northern Asia (excluding China) and North America.

Subspecies
These three subspecies belong to the species Pachybrachius fracticollis:
 Pachybrachius fracticollis collaris (Baerensprung, 1859)
 Pachybrachius fracticollis fracticollis (Schilling, 1829)
 Pachybrachius fracticollis tridens Roubal, 1959

References

External links

 

Rhyparochromidae
Articles created by Qbugbot
Insects described in 1829